Bermuda Affair is a 1956 adventure drama film directed by A. Edward Sutherland, starring Gary Merrill, Kim Hunter and Ron Randell. Bermuda Affair was the final film directed by Eddie Sutherland.

References

External links
 

1956 films
1950s adventure drama films
Seafaring films
American adventure drama films
Films directed by A. Edward Sutherland
Films scored by Elisabeth Lutyens
American black-and-white films
Columbia Pictures films
1956 drama films
Films shot in Bermuda
1950s English-language films
1950s American films